This article shows the rosters of all participating teams at the 2015–16 CEV Women's Champions League 
in several countries.

Pool A

Allianz MTV Stuttgart
The following is the roster of the German club Allianz MTV Stuttgart in the 2015–16 CEV Women's Champions League.

Head coach:  Guillermo Naranjo

Azerrail Baku
The following is the roster of the Azerí club Azerrail Baku in the 2015–16 CEV Women's Champions League.

Head coach:  Bülent Karslioglu

Dinamo Kazan
The following is the roster of the Russian club Dinamo Kazan in the 2015–16 CEV Women's Champions League.

Head coach:  Rishat Gilyazutdinov

Lokomotiv Baku
The following is the roster of the Azerí club Lokomotiv Baku in the 2015–16 CEV Women's Champions League.

Head coach:  François Salvagni

Pool B

Calcit Ljubljana
The following is the roster of the Slovenian club Calcit Ljubljana in the 2015–16 CEV Women's Champions League.

Head coach:  Gašper Ribič

Igor Gorgonzola Novara
The following is the roster of the Italian club Igor Gorgonzola Novara in the 2015–16 CEV Women's Champions League.

Head coach:  Luciano Pedulla

PGE Atom Trefl Sopot
The following is the roster of the Polish club PGE Atom Trefl Sopot in the 2015–16 CEV Women's Champions League.

Head coach:  Lorenzo Micelli

Vakıfbank İstanbul
The following is the roster of the Turkish club Vakıfbank İstanbul in the 2015–16 CEV Women's Champions League.

Head coach:  Giovanni Guidetti

Pool C

Agel Prostějov
The following is the roster of the Czech club Agel Prostějov in the 2015–16 CEV Women's Champions League.

Head coach:  Miroslav Čada

Chemik Police
The following is the roster of the Polish club Chemik Police in the 2015–16 CEV Women's Champions League.

Head coach:  Giuseppe Cuccarini

Eczacıbaşı VitrA İstanbul
The following is the roster of the Turkish club Eczacıbaşı VitrA İstanbul in the 2015–16 CEV Women's Champions League.

Head coach:  Giovanni Caprara

Pomi Casalmaggiore
The following is the roster of the Italian club Pomi Casalmaggiore in the 2015–16 CEV Women's Champions League.

Head coach:  Massimo Barbolini

Pool D

RC Cannes
The following is the roster of the French club RC Cannes in the 2015–16 CEV Women's Champions League.

Head coach:  Yan Fang

Uralochka-NTMK Ekaterinburg
The following is the roster of the Russian club Uralochka-NTMK Ekaterinburg in the 2015–16 CEV Women's Champions League.

Head coach:  Nikolay Karpol

Vizura Beograd
The following is the roster of the Serbian club Vizura Beograd in the 2015–16 CEV Women's Champions League.

Head coach:  Željko Tanasković

Voléro Zürich
The following is the roster of the Swiss club Voléro Zürich in the 2015–16 CEV Women's Champions League.

Head coach:  Avital Selinger

Pool E

Dresdner SC
The following is the roster of the German club Dresdner SC in the 2015–16 CEV Women's Champions League.

Head coach:  Alexander Waibl

Fenerbahçe Grundig Istanbul
The following is the roster of the Turkish club Fenerbahçe Grundig Istanbul in the 2015–16 CEV Women's Champions League.

Head coach:  Marcello Abbondanza

Impel Wrocław
The following is the roster of the Polish club Impel Wrocław in the 2015–16 CEV Women's Champions League.

Head coach:  Nicola Negro

Telekom Baku
The following is the roster of the Azerí club Telekom Baku in the 2015–16 CEV Women's Champions League.

Head coach:  Zoran Gajic

Pool F

CS Volei Alba Blaj
The following is the roster of the Romanian club CS Volei Alba Blaj in the 2015–16 CEV Women's Champions League.

Head coach:  Darko Zakoč

Dinamo Moscow
The following is the roster of the Russian club Dinamo Moscow in the 2015–16 CEV Women's Champions League.

Head coach:  Yury Panchenko

Nordmeccanica Piacenza
The following is the roster of the Italian club Nordmeccanica Piacenza in the 2015–16 CEV Women's Champions League.

Head coach:  Marco Gaspari

Rocheville Le Cannet
The following is the roster of the French club Rocheville Le Cannet in the 2015–16 CEV Women's Champions League.

Head coach:  Riccardo Marchesi

References

External links
Official website

Squads
CEV Women's Champions League
CEV Women's Champions League
Women's volleyball squads